Dudley Saltonstall (1738–1796) was an American naval commander during the American Revolutionary War.  He is best known as the commander of the naval forces of the 1779 Penobscot Expedition, which ended in complete disaster, with all ships lost. Norton (2003) argues the Penobscot Expedition was a total failure due to poor planning, inadequate training, and timid leadership on the part of Saltonstall.

Early life
Dudley Saltonstall was born in 1738 to Gurdon Saltonstall Jr and Mary Winthrop.  Both sides of his family were prominent in British colonial politics; his 3X great-grandfather on his father's side was Sir Richard Saltonstall, and his mother was descended from John Winthrop, who served as governor of the Province of Massachusetts Bay in the 17th century.  His father was a prominent figure in New London and Connecticut politics, serving as a probate judge and a leader of the community.  In 1765 he married Frances Babcock, the daughter of Joshua Babcock, a doctor and lawyer who served on the supreme court of the Rhode Island Colony.

Saltonstall took positions on the ships of the colonial mercantile fleet, and served as a merchant captain during the Seven Years' War.  In April 1762 he was given command of a letter of marque brigantine, the Britannia, with which he made several successful voyages to the West Indies.  During these years he established a reputation as a competent ship's captain.

Continental Navy
When the American Revolutionary War broke out, Saltonstall joined Connecticut's militia, helping to defend New London's harbor. When the Continental Navy was established, he was given one of the first captain's commissions, based on the recommendation of his brother-in-law Silas Deane, who served on Connecticut's Naval Committee. He hired John Paul Jones as his first lieutenant, and gave him the responsibility of overseeing the fitting out of the newly acquired ship. He and Jones did not get along well, as Jones did not like Saltonstall's sometimes distant and superior demeanor.

Saltonstall captained Alfred on the Continental Navy's maiden voyage in March 1776, an expedition to Nassau in the Bahamas whose objective was arms and critically needed gunpowder. The expedition was somewhat successful, as Nassau was taken, but its governor had managed to remove much of the gunpowder before the takeover was completed.  The return voyage was uneventful, although smallpox was spreading through the ships' crews, until the fleet neared Block Island.  On April 4 and 5, the fleet captured British ships. On the morning of April 6,  was spotted, and was brought to action.  In the ensuing battle, Alfred steering controls were damaged by cannon fire, and she drifted out of the action.  Glasgow was able to escape to Newport outrunning the heavily laden fleet.

While the expedition was successful, Hopkins and Saltonstall were questioned over the fleet's failure to follow its stated orders, which had been to engage the British fleet off the Carolinas, and over its failure to capture the clearly outnumbered Glasgow.  Saltonstall was not censured, but other captains in the fleet were punished for cowardly behavior.

To Saltonstall's dismay, she was too heavily laden to cross the sand bar at the mouth of the river. After numerous repeated attempts to pass the bar in 1776 and 1777, the Marine Committee gave her command to Elisha Hinman, who successfully floated her into Long Island Sound in August 1779.

He replaced Hopkins at her helm in July 1779; Hopkins was suspended for breach of orders, and was eventually dismissed from the navy.

Penobscot expedition

In the summer of 1779, the British established a base in Penobscot Bay near present-day Castine, Maine, intended to be the beginning of a new province, New Ireland, and a stronghold for attacking American privateers operating against British shipping.

The state of Massachusetts (which at that time included the District of Maine), organized an expedition to dislodge the British from this position.  Saltonstall, the senior Continental Navy commander, was given command of the naval forces, which consisted primarily of ships from the Massachusetts State Navy, a large number of privateers, and a few Continental Navy ships, including Warren. Command of the land forces accompanying the expedition was given to a relatively inexperienced Massachusetts militia brigadier general, Solomon Lovell.

The unwieldy fleet had virtually no captains with experience in any sort of fleet operations, and many of them were used to the independence afforded by their privateering operations.  While Saltonstall had participated in the Nassau expedition, he had only exercised command over his ship.  Furthermore, the expedition was to be his maiden voyage aboard his new command.  The expedition sailed for Penobscot Bay on July 19.  When it arrived near the British base, commanders of the various forces met to consider their attack in a council that was later described by Paul Revere, the militia's artillery leader, as "more like a meeting in a Coffee House than a council of War". Nothing of consequence was agreed, and the resultant lack of coordination between the various forces proved disastrous. Saltonstall and Lovell disagreed on tactics, and Saltonstall refused to take steps to engage the three British ships that were anchored near the fort in somewhat treacherous waters.  He finally engaged Henry Mowat's small fleet at long range on June 29; his inexperienced gunnery crews did little damage, while Mowat's did significant damage to Warren and other ships.  This made Saltonstall reluctant to order further engagements, including in support of land and amphibious operations.  The arrival of a British relief fleet under Admiral George Collier at the mouth of the bay led to further strains.  Saltonstall at first set up a line of defense against the arriving fleet, but when they began to close, he essentially ordered each ship to act independently, and the fleet organization dissolved.  Most of the ships were eventually grounded and burned; some were captured after brief exchanges by the British.  The land forces were essentially abandoned, and many men had to make lengthy overland treks back to civilization.

Saltonstall's reported inaction and timidity were blamed for the failure of the expedition.  This may have been an unfair judgement, as few people understood the technological and nautical limitations Saltonstall faced. Other ship captains in the expedition overwhelmingly agreed that a naval assault was too risky without a simultaneous land attack on the British fort, which Lovell refused to provide.  On September 7, 1779, a Warrant for Court Martial was issued by the Navy Board, Eastern Department, against Saltonstall. He was found guilty at the trial of ineptitude at Penobscot and was dismissed from the Navy as being "ever after incompetent to hold a government office or state post" the following October by the "Committee for Enquiring into the Failure of the Penobscot Expedition" of the Massachusetts General Court which determined that failure of the expedition was primarily the result of the "want of proper Spirit and Energy on the part of the Commodore", that he "discouraged any Enterprizes or offensive [attack] Measures on the part of our Fleet", and that the total destruction of the fleet was occasioned "principally by the Commodore's not exerting himself at all at the time of the Retreat in opposing the Enemies' foremost Ships in pursuit."

The story of the Penobscot Expedition forms the basis of the historical novel, The Fort by Bernard Cornwell.

Later career
Saltonstall returned to Connecticut, and convinced one of his wife's relatives, Adam Babcock, to support him in a privateering venture.  As captain of the 16-gun brig Minerva, he embarked on a successful career as a privateer in 1781.  Among his prizes was the richest captured by a Connecticut ship; the merchantman Hannah was valued at £80,000.

After the war, he engaged in trade with the West Indies, and also dabbled in the slave trade.  He died in 1796 in the West Indies, apparently of a tropical disease.

Further reading

Notes

References

1738 births
1796 deaths
United States Navy personnel of the American Revolution
Continental Navy officers
Deaths from yellow fever
People of Connecticut in the American Revolution
American privateers